Blaze is the surname of the following:

 Bobby Blaze (born 1963), former American professional wrestler
 Louis Edmund Blaze (1861–1951), Sri Lankan Burgher educationist and founder of Kingswood College, Kandy, Sri Lanka
 Matt Blaze, American computer scientist
 Richard Blaze (born 1985), English rugby union coach and former player
 Robin Blaze (born 1971), English opera singer
 Shaynna Blaze (born 1963), Australian interior designer, television personality, writer and former singer